Dead City Radio and the New Gods of Supertown is the first single from Venomous Rat Regeneration Vendor, the fifth studio album by recording artist Rob Zombie.  The song was released on February 23, 2013.

Premise 
The song laments the state of rock radio as it currently stands.

Video 
The video features a breakdancing skeleton along with performance by Zombie's wife Sheri Moon Zombie.  Zombie stated that as the interest in videos slowly diminished over the past decade, that he got bored with making music videos.  However, because the band was excited about Mayhem Festival and the album, that they decided to go all out to make an excellent video. It's the first music video to feature John 5 wearing face paint.

Chart positions

References 

2013 singles
2013 songs
Acid rock songs
Rob Zombie songs
Song recordings produced by Bob Marlette
Songs written by Bob Marlette
Songs written by Rob Zombie
Songs written by John 5
Roadrunner Records singles